Hidden variables may refer to:

 Confounding, in statistics, an extraneous variable in a statistical model that correlates (directly or inversely) with both the dependent variable and the independent variable
 Hidden transformation, in computer science, a way to transform a generic constraint satisfaction problem into a binary one by introducing new hidden variables
 Hidden-variable theories, in physics, the proposition that statistical models of physical systems (such as Quantum mechanics) are inherently incomplete, and that the apparent randomness of a system depends not on collapsing wave functions, but rather due to unseen or unmeasurable (and thus "hidden") variables
 Local hidden-variable theory, in quantum mechanics, a hidden-variable theory in which distant events are assumed to have no instantaneous (or at least faster-than-light) effect on local events
 Latent variables, in statistics, variables that are inferred from other observed variables

See also 
 Hidden dependency
 Hidden side effect
 Infrequent variables